Yeravninsky District (Yaruunyn aimag) is an administrative and municipal district (raion), one of the twenty-one in the Republic of Buryatia, Russia. It is located in the east of the republic. Its administrative center is the rural locality (a selo) of Sosnovo-Ozerskoye. As of the 2010 Census, the total population of the district was 18,705, with the population of Sosnovo-Ozerskoye accounting for 32.8% of that number.

Geography

The territory of the district is bound by foothills of large mountain ranges on all sides: from the southeast the spurs of the Yablonoi Mountains, from the south the Tsagan-Khurtei Range and from the west the Selenga Highlands. The Konda River flows across the district. The Yeravna-Khorga Lake System is located in the western part.

History
The district was established on September 26, 1927.

Administrative and municipal status
Within the framework of administrative divisions, Yeravninsky District is one of the twenty-one in the Republic of Buryatia. The district is divided into six selsoviets and eight somons, which comprise twenty-two rural localities. As a municipal division, the district is incorporated as Yeravninsky Municipal District. Its six selsoviets and eight somons are incorporated as fourteen rural settlements within the municipal district. The selo of Sosnovo-Ozerskoye serves as the administrative center of both the administrative and municipal district.

References

Notes

Sources

Districts of Buryatia
States and territories established in 1927